Serhiy Hryhorovych Surelo (born 30 January 1971) is a former Ukrainian football player.

References

1971 births
Sportspeople from Kyiv
Living people
Soviet footballers
FC Nyva Vinnytsia players
Ukrainian footballers
FC Tyumen players
Ukrainian expatriate footballers
Expatriate footballers in Russia
Russian Premier League players
Ukrainian Premier League players
FC CSKA Kyiv players
Changsha Ginde players
Expatriate footballers in China
FC Nyva Ternopil players
Association football defenders
FC Iskra Smolensk players